Limnohabitans australis is an aerobic, nonmotile bacterium from the genus Limnohabitans and family Comamonadaceae, which was isolated from a freshwater pond in São Carlos, São Paulo state, Brazil.

References

External links
Type strain of Limnohabitans australis at BacDive -  the Bacterial Diversity Metadatabase

Comamonadaceae